There are several museums called the Museum of Childhood:
Museum of Childhood (Edinburgh), Scotland
V&A Museum of Childhood, Bethnal Green, London, England, run by the Victoria and Albert Museum
Highland Museum of Childhood, Strathpeffer, Scotland
Sudbury Hall National Trust Museum of Childhood, Derbyshire, England

See also
Children's museum